Carleton–Mississippi Mills was a provincial electoral district in eastern Ontario, Canada. It was created for the 2007 provincial election. 78.7% of the riding came from Lanark–Carleton while 21.3% came from Nepean–Carleton.

The riding included the town of Mississippi Mills plus the former municipalities of West Carleton, Kanata and Goulbourn.

Following the 2018 election, the riding was dissolved. Most of the Ottawa portion became Kanata—Carleton, except for a sliver in the south that was transferred to Carleton. Mississippi Mills was transferred to Lanark—Frontenac—Kingston.

Members of Provincial Parliament

Election results

2007 electoral reform referendum

References

Former provincial electoral districts of Ontario
Provincial electoral districts of Ottawa